Lia Eibenschütz (1899–1985) was a German actress. She was married to the actor Kurt Vespermann with whom she had a son Gerd Vespermann who also became an actor.

Selected filmography
 The War of the Oxen (1920)
 The Legend of Holy Simplicity (1920)
 The Prisoner (1920)
 The Conspiracy in Genoa (1921)
 Parisian Women (1921)
 The Buried Self (1921)
 The Passion of Inge Krafft (1921)
 Marie Antoinette, the Love of a King (1922)
 Nathan the Wise (1922)
 The Doll Maker of Kiang-Ning (1923)
 The Merchant of Venice (1923)
 The Little Duke (1924)
 Kaddish (1924)
 Horrido (1924)
 Love's Finale (1925)
 Destiny (1925)
 The Woman from Berlin (1925)
 The Great Opportunity (1925)
 Ash Wednesday (1925)
 Women of Luxury (1925)
 Wallenstein (1925)
 Lightning (1925)
 Out of the Mist (1927)
 A Modern Casanova (1928)
 Sixteen Daughters and No Father (1928)
 The Beloved of His Highness (1928)
 The Chaste Coquette (1929)
 The House in Montevideo (1951)
 My Leopold (1955)
 The Copper (1958)
 Sweetheart of the Gods (1960)
 Neues vom Hexer (1965)
 Long Legs, Long Fingers (1966)
 The Smooth Career (1967)

External links

1899 births
1985 deaths
People from Wiesbaden
People from Hesse-Nassau
German film actresses
German silent film actresses
20th-century German actresses